is a road essay by Japanese author Haruki Murakami, about his travels in Greece and Turkey. The essays were first published in Japanese in 1990 by shinchosha as two separate volumes, the first volume covering his travels in Greece, and the other his travels in Turkey.  A popular edition collecting both volumes was published in 1991. In 2008 a renewal edition was published with some new photographs.

Contents

Additional information

Oldest edition
Subtitle: In the Holy Mountain, on the Turkish road
Photo: Eizō Matsumura, Art direction: Sakagawa, Design: Maeda, Map: Katō
Aug 28. 1990, Hardcover (21 cm), 84 page (book1), 108 page (book 2), 
Box set book 1: Greece - In the Holy Mountain (ギリシャ編 アトス―神様のリアル・ワールド)
Box set book 2: Turkey - On the Turkish road (トルコ編 チャイと兵隊と羊―21日間トルコ一周)

Popular edition
Subtitle: ―ギリシャ・トルコ辺境紀行―
Photo: Eizō Matsumura
Jul 25. 1991, Paperback (15 cm),192 page,

Revised edition
Subtitle: nothing
Photo and Caption of photo: Eizō Matsumura
Paperback (20 cm)

References

Books by Haruki Murakami
Shinchosha books